Karpiel is a Polish-language surname literally meaning "rutabaga". Notable people with the surname include:
Doris Karpiel (born 1935), American businesswoman
Józef Karpiel (1932–1994), Polish skier
Kamila Karpiel (born 2001), Polish ski jumper
Stanisław Karpiel (1909–1992), Polish cross-country skier

Polish-language surnames